Thomas de Barry (fl. 1560), was canon of Glasgow, and chief magistrate of Bothwell.

He wrote a poem on the Battle of Otterburn, the greater part of which is quoted in the eighteenth century editions of Fordun's ‘Scotichronicon.’ According to Dempster he flourished in 1560, and in all likelihood he is identical with the Thomas de Barry, presbyter, whose name appears as notary in a document preserved in the 'Registrum Episcopatus Glasguensis' in 1503.

References

Year of birth missing
Year of death missing
Clergy from Glasgow
16th-century Scottish judges
16th-century Scottish poets